Josip Picioane (born 17 February 1953) is a retired Australian football (soccer) player.

Picioane was born in Romania.

He was commonly called "Joe", and played club football for Westgate, Melbourne Hakoah, Waverley City, Melbourne Slavia and Footscray JUST.

Picioane played one international match for Australia in 1978, and played in two other games for the national team.

His son Lance is a former Australian rules footballer.

References

Living people
1953 births
Australian soccer players
Australia international soccer players
Australian people of Romanian descent
Footscray JUST players
Association football midfielders